Gustave Kuchen (1856 – 3 September 1897) was a New Zealand cricketer. He played in one first-class match for Wellington in 1880/81.

See also
 List of Wellington representative cricketers

References

External links
 

1856 births
1897 deaths
New Zealand cricketers
Wellington cricketers